In geometry, the elongated square bipyramid (or elongated octahedron) is one of the Johnson solids. As the name suggests, it can be constructed by elongating an octahedron by inserting a cube between its congruent halves.

It has been named the pencil cube or 12-faced pencil cube due to its shape.

A zircon crystal is an example of an elongated square bipyramid.

Formulae
The following formulae for volume,  surface area and height can be used if all faces are regular, with edge length :

Dual polyhedron 

The dual of the elongated square bipyramid is called a square bifrustum and has 10 faces: 8 trapezoidal and 2 square.

Related polyhedra and honeycombs 

A special kind of elongated square bipyramid without all regular faces allows a self-tessellation of Euclidean space. The triangles of this elongated square bipyramid are not regular; they have edges in the ratio 2::.

It can be considered a transitional phase between the cubic and rhombic dodecahedral honeycombs. The cells are here colored white, red, and blue based on their orientation in space. The square pyramid caps have shortened isosceles triangle faces, with six of these pyramids meeting together to form a cube. The dual of this honeycomb is composed of two kinds of octahedra (regular octahedra and triangular antiprisms), formed by superimposing octahedra into the cuboctahedra of the rectified cubic honeycomb. Both honeycombs have a symmetry of [[4,3,4]].

Cross-sections of the honeycomb, through cell centers produces a chamfered square tiling, with flattened horizontal and vertical hexagons, and squares on the perpendicular polyhedra.

With regular faces, the elongated square bipyramid can form a tessellation of space with tetrahedra and octahedra. (The octahedra can be further decomposed into square pyramids.) This honeycomb can be considered an elongated version of the tetrahedral-octahedral honeycomb.

See also 
Elongated square pyramid

References

External links 
 

Johnson solids
Pyramids and bipyramids